Oh Yeon-seo (born Oh Haet-nim []; June 22, 1987), is a South Korean actress, singer and model and is best known for her roles in television dramas My Husband Got a Family (2012), Jang Bo-ri is Here! (2014), Shine or Go Crazy (2015), Come Back Mister (2016), My Sassy Girl (2017), A Korean Odyssey (2017–18), Love with Flaws (2019–20), Mad for Each Other (2021), and Café Minamdang (2022).

Early life 
Oh was born in Jinju, South Gyeongsang Province and grew up in Changnyeong County. In the second year of middle school, Oh followed a group of friends to an audition for SM Entertainment, held in Daegu, but was rejected. However, another company contacted her saying that she had qualified and she moved to Seoul, debuting four months later at the age of 15.

Oh was accepted into Anyang Arts High School after her band's disbandment and went on to become an actress. She changed her name from Haet-nim to Yeon-seo after consulting a shaman with her mother.

Oh then entered Dongguk University, joining the theater and film department.

Career

Beginnings
Oh Yeon-seo made her entertainment debut in 2002 when she was 15-years-old under her birth name Oh Haet-nim, with the SidusHQ-managed band Luv. They released their first album, Story, with the singles "Orange Girl" and "I Still Believe in You". The band was short-lived and disbanded six months later. Oh then shifted to acting and made her debut appearance in the 2003 drama Sharp, but remained unknown.

2012–2013: Rising popularity
Though she had a major role in the 2009 film A Blood Pledge, it wasn't until she was cast in the family drama My Husband Got a Family (2012) that she gained recognition. She then joined the popular variety program We Got Married alongside MBLAQ's Lee Joon. Towards the end of 2012, Oh was cast in daily drama Here Comes Mr. Oh where she had her first lead role.

In 2013, Oh played a thoracic resident surgeon in medical drama Medical Top Team. She was appointed an ambassador for the first annual Animal Film Festival in Suncheon along with Kim Min-jun and Kal So-won to help raise awareness for animal rights and welfare in August. Oh was also appointed a Red Cross Ambassador together with actor Ryu Soo-young.

2014–present: Breakthrough
Oh played the lead role of Jang Bo-ri, a compassionate and selfless person, in the highly acclaimed series Jang Bo-ri is Here! (2014). The drama's ratings peaked at 40.4%, and led to a surge in popularity for Oh. She had a hard time playing the character as she grew up in Gyeongsang-do but her character had to speak the Jeolla-do dialect, which she had never used in her entire life.

In 2015, Oh played Shin Yool, the last princess of Balhae, in the historical drama Shine or Go Crazy, co-starring Jang Hyuk. The series was a modest hit, and topped ratings in its timeslot throughout its run.

Oh then starred alongside Rain in the SBS drama Please Come Back, Mister, which aired from February to April, 2016. She played Han Hong-nan, a male character reincarnated in a female's body. Oh was praised for her chemistry with co-star Lee Ha-nui, whom she has acted with in her previous project Shine or Go Crazy. She also impressed viewers through her comedic portrayal of her masculine role. The same year, she starred in Take Off 2, the sequel to the 2009 movie Take Off where she plays a member of the first South Korean woman's national ice hockey team.

In 2017, Oh starred in the historical drama remake of the 2001 box office hit My Sassy Girl alongside Joo Won. In August 2017, Oh signed with new management agency Celltrion Entertainment. The same year, she was cast in tvN's fantasy romantic comedy/tragedy drama A Korean Odyssey, written by the Hong sisters.

In 2018, Oh starred in the film adaptation of the Cheese in the Trap alongside Park Hae-jin, who also played the role of Yoo Jung in the drama.

In 2019, Oh was cast in the romantic comedy drama Love with Flaws. In October 2019, Oh re-signed with SidusHQ. 

In 2021, Oh was cast in the web drama Mad for Each Other which premiered on May 24 alongside Jung Woo. Later in November 2021, Oh officially signed with Story J Company. 

In 2022, she was cast in Café Minamdang as Han Jae-hui, a third-year homicide detective, alongside Seo In-guk.later in the same year Oh has returned to the big screen, with the film Men of Plastic, which will be released in November with Ma Dong-seok, Jung Kyung-ho and Oh Na-ra.

Personal life
On March 29, 2018, it was confirmed that Oh is in a relationship with actor Kim Bum. However, after a few months of dating they were reported to have parted ways.

Discography

Filmography

Awards and nominations

Listicles

References

External links

 
 
 

1987 births
Living people
People from Daegu
South Korean television actresses
South Korean female idols
South Korean film actresses
South Korean women pop singers
21st-century South Korean actresses
21st-century South Korean singers
21st-century South Korean women singers
IHQ (company) artists
Dongguk University alumni